The Bumbuna Dam is a concrete-face rock-fill dam on the Seli River near Bumbuna in Tonkolili District, Sierra Leone, and  from the capital of Freetown, the main consumer. The country's first hydroelectric dam, it supports a  power station.

The site for the dam at Bumbuna Falls was first identified in 1971, and construction was begun in 1975. Work was halted in May 1997, about 85% completed, due to the Sierra Leone Civil War, and did not restart until 2005. The project was completed and went online in 2009. Nearly a third of the dam's US$327 million cost ($103 million) was supplied by the African Development Bank. A 26 January 2005 report noted that 33 villages would be affected by the dam, although only one (of 16 households and 135 people) would require resettlement.

A second phase is planned, for a  power station. In June 2011, the government announced it had awarded the $750 million Phase II project to Joule Africa, a UK-based company. This will entail a second dam and plant. Construction was set to begin in 2014 and continue on until at least 2017.

See also
 Bumbuna II Hydroelectric Power Station

References

Dams completed in 2009
Energy infrastructure completed in 2009
Dams in Sierra Leone
Northern Province, Sierra Leone
Concrete-face rock-fill dams
Hydroelectric power stations in Sierra Leone
Infrastructure in Sierra Leone